Fionn Carr (born 17 December 1985) is an Irish rugby union player. He plays primarily as a wing but can also play at fullback. Carr played most of his professional career for Irish province Connacht in the Pro12. He also played for another Irish province, Leinster in the past. Carr has represented Ireland at Schools, Under 19 and Under 21 level, as well as at international 'A' level and the Ireland national rugby sevens team.

Carr currently plays at amateur level for Naas in the All-Ireland League. He is also the backs coach for Catholic University School in Dublin.

Youth
Carr started playing rugby with Naas at underage levels. At school level Carr played for Newbridge College. While at Newbridge, Carr played for the junior cup team once, and the senior cup team twice. Carr subsequently won a rugby scholarship to University College Dublin where he studied Arts. He left the UCD rugby team in his second year of college and joined Blackrock College.

Professional club career

Carr played once for Leinster during the 2007–08 Celtic League, starting on the wing against Glasgow Warriors.

Connacht

After finishing in UCD, Carr signed for the western province of Connacht. He was the top try-scorer for Connacht during the 2008–09 Celtic League campaign, scoring eight tries in the league. This tally put him one behind the top try-scorer Thom Evans. He also scored three tries for the team in six appearances in the 2008–09 European Challenge Cup. He ended his first stint at Connacht at the end of the 2010-11 season with 34 tries, 22 of them in the league and 12 in the Challenge Cup. At the time this made him the province's all-time top try-scorer.

Return to Leinster
Carr joined Leinster for the start of the 2011–12 season. He made his first appearance for the team since the 2007–08 season against the Ospreys. He made his first ever appearance in the Heineken Cup on 20 November 2011, against the Glasgow Warriors. In his first season back in his native province, he played 18 times in the league, with 3  of those appearances being from the bench, scoring 5 tries. He also made 2 appearances from the bench in the 2011–12 Heineken Cup, as Leinster won the competition.

The following season, Carr played 16 times for the province, but did not play in the Heineken Cup pool stages or the successful Amlin Cup campaign, with all of his appearances coming in the Pro 12. He scored only 3 tries, with those coming against Newport Gwent Dragons, Cardiff Blues and Zebre.
He left Leinster at the end of the 2012–13 season, having scored 8 tries in his two seasons there, all of them coming in the league.

Return to Connacht
Carr returned to Connacht for the 2013–14 season, having turned down the offer of a new contract with Leinster. His return debut came in the opening game of the 2013–14 Pro12 against Zebre. Carr started the game and scored a try. He played his first ever Heineken Cup game for Connacht on 11 October 2013, against Saracens in Galway. Carr left Connacht at the end of the 2015-16 season.

All Ireland League
Carr joined Naas RFC in the All Ireland League in the summer of 2016.

International career

Carr played for Ireland at various under-age levels, including Under-19 and Under-21.

Carr also played for Ireland's second tier international team, which is currently known as Ireland Wolfhounds and was previously Ireland A. His first appearance for Ireland A came in a 2009 Churchill Cup against Canada. He also started against the England Saxons on 31 January 2010, in a 17–13 loss. In 2010, the Irish Times referred to Carr as "Perhaps the fastest winger in the country one of Ireland’s outstanding performers against England Saxons this season". Despite his strong try-scoring record while with the province, Carr did not receive a full international cap.

Carr played for the Ireland national rugby sevens team in the Rugby Europe 2017 Sevens Grand Prix Series, playing as the starting centre. Carr's performance in the 2017 Grand Prix helped the team qualify for the 2018 Hong Kong Sevens and the 2018 Rugby World Cup Sevens.

References

External links
 Connacht profile

1985 births
Living people
People educated at Newbridge College
Connacht Rugby players
Leinster Rugby players
Blackrock College RFC players
Ireland international rugby sevens players